Dinlabyre is a village on the B6357 in Liddesdale, on the edge of the Newcastleton Forest, close to Castleton, in the Scottish Borders area of Scotland, in the former Roxburghshire.

Places nearby include Hermitage, Hermitage Castle, the Hermitage Water, Newcastleton, Newlands, Old Castleton, Riccarton Junction railway station, Saughtree, and the Wauchope Forest.

See also
List of places in the Scottish Borders
List of places in Northumberland

References
 RCAHMS (1956) 'An Inventory of the ancient and historical monuments of Roxburghshire:with the fourteenth report of the Commission, 2v Edinburgh, page 89, No74 held at RCAHMS A.1.1.INV/14

External links
CANMORE/RCAHMS record of Dinlabyre, carved stone, house, tower house
RCAHMS record of Dinlabyre Chapel a.k.a. Killoley Chapel
Clan Rutherfurd / Rutherford: William Oliver of Dinlabyre, Sheriff of Selkirk and Roxburgh

Villages in the Scottish Borders